Adrian Mannarino was the defending champion but chose not to defend his title.

Quentin Halys won the title after defeating Alexey Vatutin 6–3, 7–6(7–1) in the final.

Seeds

Draw

Finals

Top half

Bottom half

References
Main Draw
Qualifying Draw

Open BNP Paribas Banque de Bretagne - Singles
2018 Singles